The Apollo Lunar Surface Experiments Package (ALSEP) comprised a set of scientific instruments placed by the astronauts at the landing site of each of the five Apollo missions to land on the Moon following Apollo 11 (Apollos 12, 14, 15, 16, and 17). Apollo 11 left a smaller package called the Early Apollo Scientific Experiments Package, or EASEP.

Background
The instrumentation and experiments that would comprise ALSEP were decided in February 1966. Specifically, the experiments, institutions responsible, and principal investigators and coinvestigators were:
 Passive Lunar Seismic Experiment: Massachusetts Institute of Technology, Frank Press; Columbia University, George Sutton; Georgia Tech, Robert Hostetler 
 Lunar Tri-axis Magnetometer: Ames Research Center, C. P. Sonett; Marshall Space Flight Center, Jerry Modisette.
 Medium-Energy Solar Wind: Jet Propulsion Laboratory, C. W. Snyder and M. M. Neugebauer.
 Suprathermal Ion Detection: Rice University, J. W. Freeman, Jr.; Marshall Space Flight Center, Curt Michel.
 Lunar Heat Flow Management: Columbia University, M. Langseth; Yale University, S. Clark.
 Low-Energy Solar Wind: Rice University, B. J. O'Brien.
 Active Lunar Seismic Experiment: Stanford University, R. L. Kovach; United States Geological Survey, J. S. Watkins.
SNAP-27 isotopic power system: Sandia National Laboratories, Jim Leonard

The ALSEP was built and tested by Bendix Aerospace in Ann Arbor, Michigan. The instruments were designed to run autonomously after the astronauts left and to make long-term studies of the lunar environment. They were arrayed around a Central Station which supplied power generated by a radioisotope thermoelectric generator (RTG) to run the instruments and communications so data collected by the experiments could be relayed to Earth. Thermal control was achieved by passive elements (insulation, reflectors, thermal coatings) as well as power dissipation resistors and heaters. Data collected from the instruments were converted into a telemetry format and transmitted to Earth.

Deployment
The ALSEP was stored in the Lunar Module's Scientific Equipment (SEQ) Bay in two separate subpackages. The base of the first subpackage formed the Central Station while the base of the second subpackage was part of the RTG. A subpallet was also attached to the second subpackage which usually carried one or two of the experiments and the antenna gimbal assembly. On Apollo 12, 13, and 14, the second subpackage also stored the Lunar Hand Tool Carrier (HTC). The exact deployment of experiments differed by mission. The following pictures show a typical procedure from Apollo 12.

Common elements
Each ALSEP station had some common elements.

List of experiments

List of missions
Each mission had a different array of experiments.

Apollo 11 (EASEP)

Because of the risk of an early abort on the Moon, geologists persuaded NASA to permit only experiments that could be set up or completed in 10 minutes. As a result, Apollo 11 did not leave a full ALSEP package, but left a simpler version called the Early Apollo Surface Experiments Package (EASEP). Since there was only one 2 hour 40 minute EVA planned, the crew would not have enough time to deploy a full ALSEP, which usually took one to two hours to deploy. Both packages were stored in the LM's SEQ bay.

Engineers designed the EASEP to deploy with one squeeze handle, and the Laser Ranging Retro Reflector (LRRR) also deployed within ten minutes. Despite the simpler design, the seismometer was sensitive enough to detect Neil Armstrong's movements during sleep.

Apollo 12

The antenna gimbal assembly was stored on the subpallet. The stool for the PSE, the ALSEP tools, carrybar, and HTC was stored on the second subpackage.

Apollo 13

 
Because of the aborted landing, none of the experiments were deployed. However, the Apollo 13 S-IVB stage was deliberately crashed on the Moon to provide a signal for the Apollo 12 PSE.

The antenna gimbal assembly was stored on the first subpackage. The stool for the PSE, the ALSEP tools, carrybar, and the Lunar drill was stored on the subpallet. The HTC was stored on the second subpackage.

Apollo 14

The antenna gimbal assembly was stored on the subpallet. The stool for the PSE, the ALSEP tools, carrybar, and HTC was stored on the second subpackage.

Apollo 15

The antenna gimbal assembly was stored on the subpallet. The ALSEP tools, carrybar, and stool for the PSE was stored on the second subpackage.

Apollo 16

Apollo 17

After Apollo
The ALSEP system and instruments were controlled by commands from Earth. The stations ran from deployment until the support operations were terminated on 30 September 1977 due primarily to budgetary considerations. Additionally, by 1977 the power packs could not run both the transmitter and any other instrument. However, the transmitters were not switched off, and all 5 ALSEPs were observed by the Soviet radio telescope RATAN-600 between 18 October and 28 November 1977, after the official termination of their mission.

ALSEP systems are visible in several images taken by the Lunar Reconnaissance Orbiter during its orbits over Apollo landing sites.

See also

 Apollo program
 Lunar laser ranging experiment
 Hexanitrostilbene, a vacuum stable explosive used in the ALSEP.
 Lunar Roving Vehicle
 List of artificial objects on the Moon

Notes
 Encyclopedia Astronautica website, 14 February 1966 entry.

References

Bibliography
 Brzostowski, M.A., and Brzostowski, A.C., Archiving the Apollo active seismic data, The Leading Edge, Society of Exploration Geophysicists, April, 2009.

External links
 Astronautix Site
 NSSDC Apollo Page
 Apollo Scientific Experiments Data Handbook
 ALSEP Termination Report
 Catalog of Apollo Experiment Operations
 Apollo Lunar Surface Experiments Package, Design Certification Review (1971)
 Archive of ALSEP documents, from the Lunar and Planetary Institute

Apollo program hardware
Lunar science
Bendix Corporation